Polyalthia lateritia is a species of plant in the family Annonaceae. It is a tree found in Peninsular Malaysia and Thailand.

References

lateritia
Trees of Peninsular Malaysia
Trees of Thailand
Least concern plants
Taxonomy articles created by Polbot
Taxa named by James Sinclair (botanist)